Asiapistosia subnigra is a moth of the subfamily Arctiinae. It was described by John Henry Leech in 1899. It is found in the Chinese provinces of Shaanxi, Zhejiang, Fujian, Hubei, Hunan, Sichuan, Yunnan and Guangdong.

References

Notes
 
  1899: Lepidoptera Heterocera from Northern China, Japan, and Corea. Part II. Transactions of the Entomological Society of London 1899: 99-215.

Moths described in 1899
Lithosiina
Moths of Asia